Shinbone Alley is a 1970 American animated musical comedy film based on the Joe Darion, Mel Brooks, and George Kleinsinger musical of the same name as well as the original Archy and Mehitabel stories by Don Marquis. It was directed by John David Wilson. Eddie Bracken reprised his role from the Broadway musical; Carol Channing played the starring role originally performed by Eartha Kitt.

Plot
A New York City poet named Archy (Eddie Bracken) attempts suicide only to come back as a cockroach. As he learns how to write poetry by hopping on typewriter keys, he grows used to his new life and becomes infatuated with Mehitabel (Carol Channing), the singing alley cat. She instead goes out with the tomcat Big Bill (Alan Reed). When Big Bill dumps Mehitabel, Archy confronts her about her wild ways in general and her affinity for bad boy tomcats in particular. She momentarily agrees; however, self-appointed theatre maestro cat Tyrone T. Tattersall (John Carradine) promises to make her a star and becomes her next lover. Archy attempts and fails suicide again. In the theatre, Mehitabel holds up her end of the deal in getting food for Tyrone, but he kicks her off the stage. Archy and Big Bill watch her, and Mehitabel gets back together with Big Bill. Back to his typewriter, Archy channels his frustration in calling the other insects and spiders to revolution. He immediately drops the scheme when he hears the news that Mehitabel has kittens, and Big Bill has left the scene again. It's a rainy evening, and Archy points out to Mehitabel, that her kittens, who are inside a cover less trashcan, are floating away from her, and the two of them rescue the kittens, however, a moody Mehitabel, chases Archy away for interfering with her private business. Archy persuades Mehitabel to give up her life as an alley cat and support the kittens with a "job" as a house cat.

Later, however, when Archy comes to visit her in the upscale house, with her visibly changed by the experience, she reminds him that social class now separates them from being friends and kicks him out—regretting it later. Archy gets drunk and meets several ladybug street walkers who find his love poems about Mehitabel. Big Bill makes fun of him. One day, Mehitabel returns to Shinbone Alley and sings and dances again like her old self. After having tried to reform her, Archy realizes he liked Mehitabel for her wild ways all along and accepts her for "being what she has to be," content to be just friends.

Voice cast
Carol Channing ...  Mehitabel
Eddie Bracken ...  Archy
Alan Reed ...  Big Bill
John Carradine ...  Tyrone T. Tattersall
Hal Smith ...  Freddie the Rat / Prissy Cat
Joan Gerber ...  Penelope the Fat Cat / Ladybugs of the Evening
Ken Sansom ...  Rosie the Cat
Julie Dawn Cole ... Sally the Cat
Sal Delano...  Beatnik Spider
Byron Kane ... Newspaperman

Production
In 1968, the film began pre-production, with meetings between the producers (Preston Fleet & John Wilson) and the writers (Dick Kinney, Marty Murphy, & David Detiege), they decided to take heavy inspiration from the writing and illustrations of Archy and Mehitabel, to set up a "visual jazz experience". But them, this presented a problem, and midway into pre-production the thought occurred to modernize the George Herriman illustrations in a contemporary style. Storyboards were drawn by Richard Kinney and Marty Murphy. In 1969, the designs of the characters were finalized, and animation and voice acting soon began.

In 1970, a year before the film's theatrical release, it was screened at the Atlanta Georgia International Film Festival and won a Golden Phoenix Award.

Reception
Shinbone Alley did not fare well at the box office. However, New York magazine critic Judith Crist called it "a blend of literature, musical comedy and fine arts... pure sophisticated entertainment for all, and a refreshment for moviegoers." Vincent Canby, in his New York Times review, wrote: "'Shinbone Alley' is a little like the old mehitabel. It suffers from split personality being based, as it is, on works that must go over the heads of 8-year-olds .. but it's executed in a mostly juvenile style that's not too far removed from what the children see on television. It's a very mixed bag and this, in case you hadn't guessed, is a very mixed review."

References

External links
Shinbone Alley on IMDb
Shinbone Alley at Rotten Tomatoes
Shinbone Alley at AllMovie

1970 films
1970 animated films
1970s American animated films
1970s musical comedy films
Adaptations of works by Don Marquis
Adaptations of works by Mel Brooks
Allied Artists films
American animated comedy films
Animated films about cats
Animated films about insects
Animated musical films
American musical comedy films
Films about reincarnation
Films based on adaptations
Films based on musicals
Films set in New York City
Films directed by John David Wilson
1970 comedy films
1970s English-language films
Alternative versions of films